Robert "Silyn" Roberts (28 March 1871 – 15 August 1930) was a Welsh clergyman, writer, teacher and pacifist.

History
Roberts, a Calvinistic Methodist minister, was a noted Welsh-language poet, the winner of the Crown at the 1902 National Eisteddfod of Wales with his poem "Trystan ac Esyllt". Born in Bryn Llidiart, Llanllyfni, Caernarfonshire, he had worked as a slate quarryman before attending the University College of North Wales, Bangor, and Bala Theological College. From 1901 until 1912 he was a Calvinistic Methodist minister, firstly in Lewisham, London, and then in Tanygrisiau, Blaenau Ffestiniog, Merionethshire.

While living in London in the early 1900s Roberts met and befriended Vladimir Lenin.

A Socialist and a close associate of the academic and politician W. J. Gruffydd, Roberts represented the Labour Party on Merioneth County Council. In collaboration with Thomas Jones, he campaigned for adult education opportunities, and founded a branch of the Workers Educational Association in North Wales. He also supported the campaign against tuberculosis in Wales.

Works

Poetry
Telynegion (1900) 
Trystan ac Esyllt a Chaniadau Eraill (1904)

Fiction
Llio Plas y Nos (1945)

Non-fiction
Y Blaid Lafur Anibynnol, ei Hanes a'i Hamcan (1908)

Translations
Gwyntoedd Croesion (translation of Cross Currents by J. O. Francis; Educational Pub. Co., 1924)
Bugail Geifr Lorraine (translation of Le chevrier de Lorraine by Émile Souvestre; Hughes a'i Fab, 1925)

Sources

1871 births
1930 deaths
Crowned bards
Welsh poets
Welsh Calvinist and Reformed Christians
Alumni of Bangor University
Welsh Methodist ministers